Quisumbingia is a genus of plants in the Apocynaceae first described as a genus in 1915. It was initially given the name Petalonema upon discovery. In 1936, it was renamed Quisumbingia because the name Petalonema had already been used for a cyanobacterium. It contains only one known species, Quisumbingia merrillii, endemic to the Philippines.

References

Asclepiadoideae
Monotypic Apocynaceae genera
Endemic flora of the Philippines
Taxa named by Elmer Drew Merrill